In mathematics, Capelli's identity, named after , is an analogue of the formula det(AB) = det(A) det(B), for certain matrices with noncommuting entries, related to the representation theory of the Lie algebra . It can be used to relate an invariant ƒ to the invariant Ωƒ, where Ω is Cayley's Ω process.

Statement
Suppose that xij for  i,j = 1,...,n are commuting variables. Write  Eij for the polarization operator 

The  Capelli identity states that the following differential operators, expressed as determinants, are equal:

Both sides are differential operators. The determinant on the left has non-commuting entries, and is expanded with all terms preserving their "left to right" order. Such a determinant is often called a column-determinant, since it can be obtained by the column expansion of the determinant starting from the first column. It can be formally written as

where in the product first come the elements from the first column, then from the second and so on.  The determinant on the far right is Cayley's omega process, and the one on the left is the Capelli determinant.

The operators Eij can be written in a matrix form:

where  are matrices with elements Eij, xij,  respectively. If all elements in these matrices would be commutative then  clearly . The Capelli identity shows that despite noncommutativity there exists a "quantization" of the formula above. The only price for the noncommutativity is a small correction:  on the left hand side. For generic noncommutative matrices formulas like

do not exist, and the notion of the 'determinant' itself does not make sense for generic noncommutative matrices. That is why the Capelli identity still holds some mystery, despite many proofs offered for it. A very short proof does not seem to exist. Direct verification of the statement can be given as an exercise for n = 2, but is already long for n = 3.

Relations with representation theory

Consider the following slightly more general context. Redefine   by almost the same formula:

One can easily see that such operators satisfy the commutation relations:

Here   denotes the commutator . These are the same commutation relations which are satisfied by the matrices  which have zeros everywhere except the position , where 1 stands. ( are sometimes called matrix units).

Case m = 1 and representation Sk Cn 

It is especially instructive to consider the special case m = 1; in this case we have xi1, which is abbreviated as xi:

In particular, for the polynomials of the first degree it is seen that:

Going further, it is seen that the differential operators  preserve the degree of the polynomials, and hence the polynomials of each fixed degree form a  subrepresentation of the Lie algebra  . One can see further that the space of homogeneous polynomials of degree k can be identified with the symmetric tensor power  of the standard representation .

One can also easily identify the highest weight structure of these representations. The monomial  is a highest weight vector, indeed:  for i < j. Its highest weight equals to (k, 0, ... ,0), indeed: .

Similar formulas  define the so-called fermionic representation, here  are anti-commuting variables. Highest weight of such representation is (0, ..., 0, 1, 0, ..., 0).

Capelli identity for m = 1 

Let us return to the Capelli identity. One can prove the following:

the motivation for this equality is the following: consider  for some commuting variables . The matrix  is of rank one and hence its determinant is equal to zero. Elements of matrix  are defined by the similar formulas, however, its elements do not  commute.

Let us also mention that similar identity can be given for the characteristic polynomial:

where .  The commutative counterpart of this is a simple fact that for rank = 1 matrices the characteristic polynomial contains only the first and the second coefficients.

Consider an example for n = 2.

Using

 

we see that this is equal to:

The universal enveloping algebra    and its center  
An interesting property of the Capelli determinant is that it commutes with all operators Eij, that is, the commutator  is equal to zero. It can be generalized:

Consider any elements Eij in any ring, such that they satisfy the commutation relation , (so they can be differential operators above, matrix units eij or any other elements) define elements Ck as follows:

where 

then:

 elements Ck commute with all elements Eij
 elements Ck can be given by the formulas similar to the commutative case:

i.e. they are sums of principal  minors of the matrix E, modulo the Capelli correction  . In particular element C0 is the Capelli determinant considered above.

These statements are interrelated with the Capelli identity, as will be discussed below,  and similarly to it the  direct few lines short proof does not seem to exist, despite the simplicity of the formulation.

The universal enveloping algebra

can defined as an algebra generated by

Eij

subject to the relations

alone. They are sometimes called Capelli generators. The Capelli identities for them will be discussed below.

Consider an example for n = 2.

(It corresponds to an obvious fact that the identity matrix commute with all other matrices). Let us do it for :

General m and  dual pairs 

Let us return to the general case:

for arbitrary n and m. Definition of operators Eij can be written in a matrix form: , where   is  matrix  with elements  ;   is  matrix  with elements  ;   is  matrix  with elements  .

Capelli–Cauchy–Binet identities

For general m matrix E is given as product of the two rectangular matrices: X and transpose to D. If all elements of these matrices would commute then one knows that the determinant of E can be expressed by the so-called Cauchy–Binet formula via minors of X and D. An analogue of this formula also exists for matrix E again for the same mild price of the correction :

,

In particular (similar to the commutative case): if m < n, then ; if m = n we return to the identity above.

Let us also mention that similar to the commutative case (see Cauchy–Binet for minors), one can express not only the determinant of E, but also its minors via minors of X and D:

,

Here K = (k1 < k2 < ... < ks), L = (l1 < l2 < ... < ls), are arbitrary multi-indexes; as usually   denotes a submatrix of M formed by the elements M kalb. Pay attention that the Capelli correction now contains s, not n as in previous formula.  Note that for s=1, the correction (s − i) disappears and we get just the definition of E as a product of X and transpose to D. Let us also mention that for generic K,L corresponding minors do not commute with all elements Eij, so the Capelli identity exists not only for central elements.

As a corollary of this formula and the one for the characteristic polynomial in the previous section let us mention the following:

where  . This formula is similar to the commutative case, modula  at the left hand side and t[n] instead of tn at the right hand side.

Relation to dual pairs

Modern interest in these identities has been much stimulated by  Roger Howe who considered them in his theory of reductive dual pairs (also known as Howe duality). To make the first contact with these ideas, let us look more precisely on operators  . Such operators preserve the degree of polynomials. Let us look at the polynomials of degree 1: , we see that index l is preserved. Let us give another look on this vector space:

Such point of view gives the first hint  of symmetry between m and n. To deepen this idea consider:

These operators  are given by the same formulas as   modula renumeration , hence by the same arguments we can deduce that  form a representation of the Lie algebra  in the vector space of polynomials of xij. Before going further we can mention the following property: differential operators  commute with differential operators .

The Lie group   acts on the vector space  in a natural way. One can show that the corresponding action of Lie algebra  is given by the differential operators  and   respectively. This explains the commutativity of these operators.

The following deeper properties actually hold true:

 

The summands are indexed by the Young diagrams D, and representations  are mutually non-isomorphic. And diagram  determine  and vice versa.

 In particular the representation of the big group    is multiplicity free, that is each irreducible representation occurs only one time.

One easily observe the strong similarity to Schur–Weyl duality.

Generalizations

Much work have been done on the identity and its generalizations. Approximately two dozens of mathematicians and physicists contributed to the subject, to name a few: R. Howe, B. Kostant Fields medalist A. Okounkov A. Sokal, D. Zeilberger.

It seems  historically the first generalizations were obtained by Herbert Westren Turnbull in 1948, who found the generalization for the case of symmetric matrices (see for modern treatments).

The other generalizations can be divided into several patterns. Most of them are based on the Lie algebra point of view. Such generalizations consist of changing Lie algebra  to simple Lie algebras and their super (q),  and current versions. As well as identity can be generalized for different reductive dual pairs. And finally one can consider not only the determinant of the matrix E, but its permanent, trace of its powers and immanants. Let us mention few more papers; 
 
 
 
 
still the list of references is incomplete. It has been believed for quite a long time that the identity is intimately related with semi-simple Lie algebras. Surprisingly a new purely algebraic generalization of the identity have been found in 2008 by S. Caracciolo, A. Sportiello, A. D. Sokal  which has nothing to do with any Lie algebras.

Turnbull's identity for symmetric matrices 
Consider symmetric matrices 

Herbert Westren Turnbull in 1948 discovered the following identity:

Combinatorial proof can be found in the paper, another proof and amusing generalizations in the paper, see also discussion below.

The Howe–Umeda–Kostant–Sahi identity  for antisymmetric matrices 
Consider antisymmetric matrices 

Then

The Caracciolo–Sportiello–Sokal identity  for Manin matrices 
Consider two matrices M and Y over some associative ring which satisfy the following condition

for some elements Qil.  Or ”in words”: elements in j-th column of M commute with elements in k-th row of Y unless j = k, and in this case commutator of the elements Mik and Ykl depends only on i, l, but does not depend on k.

Assume that M is a Manin matrix (the simplest example is the matrix with commuting elements).

Then for the square matrix case

Here Q is a matrix with elements Qil, and diag(n − 1, n − 2, ..., 1, 0) means the diagonal matrix with the elements n − 1, n − 2, ..., 1, 0 on the diagonal.

See  proposition 1.2' formula (1.15) page 4, our Y is transpose to their B.

Obviously the original Cappeli's identity the particular case of this identity. Moreover from this identity one can see that in the original Capelli's identity one can consider elements

for arbitrary functions fij and the identity still will be true.

The Mukhin–Tarasov–Varchenko identity and the Gaudin model

Statement 

Let z be another formal variable (commuting  with x).  Let A and B be some matrices which elements are  complex numbers.

 

Here the first determinant is understood (as always) as column-determinant of a matrix with non-commutative entries. The determinant on the right is calculated as if all the elements commute, and putting all x and z on the left, while derivations on the right. (Such  recipe is called a Wick ordering in the quantum mechanics).

The Gaudin quantum integrable system and Talalaev's theorem  
The matrix

is a Lax matrix for the Gaudin quantum integrable spin chain system. D. Talalaev solved the long-standing problem of the explicit solution for the full set of the quantum commuting conservation laws for the Gaudin model, discovering the following theorem.

Consider

Then for all i,j,z,w

i.e.  Hi(z) are generating functions in z for the  differential operators in x which all commute. So they provide quantum commuting conservation laws for the Gaudin model.

Permanents, immanants, traces – "higher Capelli identities" 

The original Capelli identity is a statement about determinants. Later, analogous identities were found for permanents, immanants and traces.
Based on the  combinatorial approach paper by S.G. Williamson 
was one of the first results in this direction.

Turnbull's identity for permanents of  antisymmetric matrices 
Consider the antisymmetric matrices X and D with elements xij and corresponding derivations, as in the case of the HUKS identity above.

Then

Let us cite:  "...is stated without proof at the end of Turnbull’s paper".   The authors themselves follow Turnbull – at the very end of their
paper they write:

"Since the proof of this last identity is very similar to the proof of Turnbull’s symmetric analog (with a slight twist), we leave it as an instructive and pleasant exercise for the reader.".

The identity is deeply analyzed in paper
.

References

Further reading

Invariant theory
Mathematical identities
Representation theory of Lie groups
Lie algebras
Determinants